The Clarkforkian North American Stage, on the geologic timescale, is the North American  faunal stage according to the North American Land Mammal Ages chronology (NALMA), typically set from 56,800,000 to 55,400,000 years BP lasting .

Considered to be within the Paleocene, more specifically the Late Paleocene, the Clarkforkian shares its upper boundary with the Thanetian.

The Clarkforkian is preceded by the Tiffanian and followed by the Wasatchian NALMA stages.

Substages
It is considered to contain the following substages:
Cf3: (shares the upper boundary) and lower boundary source of the base of Clarkforkian (approximate) and upper boundary source of the base of the Ypresian (approximate).
Cf2: Is the lower boundary source of the base of the Clarkforkian (approximate)
Cf1: Upper boundary source of the base of the Ypresian (approximate)

Fauna

Notable mammals 

Multituberculata - non-therian mammals

 Ectypodus, neoplagiaulacid multituberculate

Metatheria - marsupials

 Peradectes, peradectid marsupial

Carnivora - carnivores, including living carnivorous mammals

 Didymictis, viverravid carnivoran

Condylarthra - archaic ungulates

 Apheliscus, hyopsodontid condylarth
 Ectocion, phenacodontid condylarth
 Phenacodus, phenacodontid condylarth
 Thryptacodon, raccoon-like arctocyonid condylarth

Creodonta - extinct group of carnivorous mammals

 Oxyaena, semi-arboreal creodont

Dinocerata - large, tusked herbivores

 Probathyopsis, early North American uintathere

Eulipotyphla - insectivorous mammals

 Plagioctenodon, nyctitheriid insectivore
 Wyonycteris, nyctitheriid insectivore

Mesonychia - carnivorous hoofed mammals

 Dissacus, dog-sized mesonychid

Pantodonta - large herbivorous mammals

 Coryphodon, semi-aquatic, hippo-like pantodont
 Titanoides, large pantodont

Primatomopha - primates and relatives

 Carpolestes, carpolestid plesiadapiform
 Chiromyoides, small plesiadapid
 Phenacolemur, paromomyid plesiadapiform
 Plesiadapis, plesiadapid plesiadapiform

Rodentia - rodents

 Alagomys, alagomyid rodent
 Paramys, ischyromyid rodent

Tillodontia - medium sized, digging herbivores

 Esthonyx, esthonychid tillodont

References

 
Paleocene life
Paleocene animals of North America